There are 57 recorded species of Odonata in Britain, made up of 21 damselflies (suborder Zygoptera) and 36 dragonflies (suborder Anisoptera). Of these, 42 species (17 damselflies and 25 dragonflies) are resident breeders, and the remainder are either extinct species, or vagrants - in respect of the latter, this list follows the decisions of the Odonata Records Committee. 

Some of these rare species have not been seen since the 19th Century; however, the British Odonata list is also currently undergoing a period of unprecedented change, as new species are being discovered for the first time, some going on to become breeding species.

This list is based on the following principal references:
 Merritt, R., N. W. Moore and B. C. Eversham (1996), Atlas of the dragonflies of Britain and Ireland, HMSO
 Parr, A. J. (1996), Dragonfly movement and migration in Britain and Ireland, Journal of the British Dragonfly Society Vol. 12 No. 2 pp. 33–50
 Parr, Adrian (2000a), An Annotated List of the Odonata of Britain and Ireland, Atropos No. 11 pp. 10–20

A number of other references were used to provide information on specific topics, including rare vagrants, post-1990 additions, predictions, species claimed but not accepted/species of uncertain provenance, non-natives, taxonomic matters and species found only in the Channel Islands.

Ireland's Odonata fauna is quite different from that of Britain, with many fewer breeding species, but one additional species not found in Britain, Irish Damselfly Coenagrion lunulatum – see List of Odonata species of Ireland for more information.

New species since 1990 
After a period in which the British Odonata list has been relatively static, since 1990, many new species have been found and some have gone on to become regular breeding species. In chronological order of their first record, these new species are:
 Scarlet dragonfly, first recorded at Hayle Kimbro Pool, The Lizard, Cornwall on 7 August 1995 (Jones 1996), with a small number of further records at scattered locations throughout Britain
 Banded darter (Sympetrum pedemontanum), recorded just once to date, near Tredegar, Monmouthshire on 16 August 1995, although a darter seen on 29 July 2003 at Hickling Broad, Norfolk, which had dark bands on its wings, may have been this species
 Lesser emperor, first recorded at Cinderford, in the Forest of Dean, Gloucestershire on 13 June 1996 (Phillips 1997a, 1997b) and now occurring annually; breeding evidence was found at Hayle Kimbro Pool (Jones 2000) and also at Bake Fishing Lakes, Cornwall (Pellow 2000) in 1999, and the species appears to be resident at Dungeness, Kent
 Green darner, first recorded at Penlee Battery, Cornwall on 9 September 1998 – the first record for Europe (Pellow 1999a, 1999b), with several other records in South West England that autumn, but none since to date
 Small red-eyed damselfly, first recorded in Essex on 17 July 1999 (Dewick and Gerussi 2000) – now a well-established breeding species across much of southern England
 Southern emerald damselfly, first recorded at Winterton Dunes, Norfolk on 30 July 2002 (Nobes 2003); in 2003 & 2004, the species was again seen here and at Sandwich Bay, Kent (Forrest 2005), but there have been no subsequent sightings at either location.
 Common winter damselfly, first recorded at Tonna, Neath in South Wales in December 2008.
 Yellow-spotted emerald, first (and only) record at Carlton Marshes, Suffolk, in July 2018.

Many British Odonata enthusiasts expect further species to be added to the list in the near future. The list below is up to date  breeding season.

Extinct species and casual breeders 

While most species on the list below are either extant established breeding species or rare vagrants, some do not fall into these two categories. The following species bred in the past but are now extinct:
 Dainty damselfly – only ever known from marshes along the Thames Estuary in Essex, first recorded in 1946, and last recorded in 1952.  Rediscovered 2010.
 Norfolk damselfly – only ever known from the Norfolk Broads between 1902 and 1957
 Orange-spotted emerald – only ever known from two areas in southern England, one around the River Stour and Moors River in east Dorset, where the species was recorded from 1820 to 1963, and the other on the River Tamar in Devon where the species was recorded in 1946 only.
The following species are sporadic or casual breeders:
 Yellow-winged darter – this species has a pattern of establishing small breeding colonies following influxes, but none of these have become permanently established
 Red-veined darter – following influxes in previous years, this species, like the yellow-winged darter, has formed temporary breeding colonies. However, since the mid-1990s, the number of these colonies has increased and many have continued to be present from year-to-year, so this species is now better regarded as a successful colonist.

Non-native introductions 
Records of non-native Odonata species in Britain have been confined to individuals found within heated greenhouses associated with nurseries for aquatic plants. None of these species have been recorded in wild situations or gone on to establish populations in the wild. Details of species which have occurred in such circumstances can be found in Agassiz 1981, Brooks 1988, and Parr 2000a.

The list 
The list is in taxonomic order. The English name of each species is given, followed by its scientific name, details of the range countries for each breeding species, and an overall status code for species which are not long-established extant breeding species.

The following abbreviations are used to give country-by-country distribution information for the breeding species:
 Eng to indicate that the species' breeding range includes England
 Scot to indicate that the species' breeding range includes Scotland
 Wales to indicate that the species' breeding range includes Wales

The following codes are used to give status details for those species which are not long-established extant breeding species:
 Ex to indicate a former breeding species, now extinct in Britain (with the year of the last record in brackets)
 RC to indicate that the species is a recent (i.e. post-1990) colonist (with the year of the first British record in brackets, except for Red-veined Darter which has occurred as a migrant and sporadic breeder for many decades)
 V to indicate a species only recorded as a vagrant (with the year of the first record in brackets, except for species with long histories as visitors to Britain)

Suborder Zygoptera (damselflies)

Family Calopterygidae (demoiselles)

Family Lestidae (emerald damselflies)

Family Coenagrionidae (blue, blue-tailed, and red damselflies)

Family Platycnemididae (white-legged damselflies)

Suborder Anisoptera (dragonflies)

Family Gomphidae (club-tailed dragonflies)

Family Aeshnidae (hawkers and emperors)

Family Cordulegastridae (golden-ringed dragonflies)

Family Corduliidae (emerald dragonflies)

Family Libellulidae (chasers, skimmers, and darters)

Notes 

 Willow emerald damselfly, since 2007 this species is established and spreading in south-east England, especially Suffolk and Essex. It was previously only known from a single record from Hertfordshire in 1899 (although this record is based on a specimen regarded by some as perhaps not of British origin, see Gladwin 1997) and a single exuvia collected in Kent in 1992 (Brook & Brook 2002, 2004).
 Common clubtail was formerly known as club-tailed dragonfly.
 Yellow-legged dragonfly is known from just a single record, in Sussex in 1818.
 Southern migrant hawker was known from just a single record, in Kent in 1952, although an Aeshna seen in 1992 on the outskirts of Bristol may have been this species (Holmes 1993), and the species has been recorded twice in Jersey since 1998 (Long 2000, Parr 2005). However in 2006 four specimens were seen: In the Adur valley in West Sussex on 13 July website of reporter with photo; Grimstone Warren, Norfolk on 21 July; Little Wootton Inclosure New Forest (SZ 227 987) on 6 August; And at the mouth of the Beaulieu River in Hampshire on 10 August. Since 2012 it has probably become established as a breeding species in the Thames Estuary area.
 Vagrant emperor records taken from Silsby (1993). 
 Yellow-winged darter is listed as a vagrant, but is occasionally subject to large influxes e.g. in 1995.
 Highland darter and common darter may be conspecific (see Merritt & Vick 1983).
 Large white-faced darter has been recorded only once, at Sheerness, Kent in 1859.
 Wandering glider has been recorded only three times – at Horning, Norfolk in 1823, Bolton, Lancashire in 1951 and in Kent in 1989, although the two 20th Century records may result from accidental introductions.
 Wandering glider was formerly known as globe skimmer.
 Habitat limited to Eastern England and particularly East Anglia.

Rejected species, species of uncertain provenance, predictions and Channel Islands species 
1. The following species have been claimed but not accepted by the Odonata Records Committee:

 Two-spotted dragonfly (Epitheca bimaculata) was reported from Leicestershire in 2002 – see Parr (2003).

2. The following species have been recorded, and their identification accepted, but the circumstances surrounding the records and/or specimens cast doubt on their natural occurrence, and they are not included in the official British list:

 Blue dasher (Pachydiplax longipennis), which was found dead on the Sedco 706 oil rig in the North Sea off the Shetland Isles in early September 1999 (Parr 2000b). It was not accepted as the species is not a strong migrant and the rig receives weekly supplies from Texas.

 Southern darter (Sympetrum meridionale), only known from old specimens with vague data (but recorded from the Channel Islands).

 Alpine emerald (Somatochlora alpestris), only known from a single specimen labelled as having been collected by K. J. Morton in Inverness in 1926; however Morton was travelling in continental Europe on the date in question.

3. The following is a list of species which have previously been predicted to occur in Britain but have not yet been recorded (see Merritt, Moore & Eversham 1996 pp. 113–114 and Parr 1998, 1999): subarctic darner (Aeshna subarctica), northern white-faced darter (Leucorrhina rubicunda) and small emerald damselfly (Lestes virens).

4. In addition to the species listed above, southern skimmer (Orthetrum brunneum) and southern darter (Sympetrum meridionale) have been recorded in the Channel Islands (Parr 2000a).

References

External links 
 British Dragonfly Society

Odonataof Great Britain
Great Britain
Odonata species of Great Britain
Odonata
Dragonflies of Europe